The Varner Unit is a high-security state prison for men of the Arkansas Department of Correction in Varner, Choctaw Township, unincorporated Lincoln County, Arkansas, United States. The prison can house over 1,600 prisoners, and it includes a 468-bed supermax (Super Maximum Security) facility. The supermax and non-supermax facilities are separate from one another.

The Varner Unit Supermax houses male inmates scheduled for execution in Arkansas, currently performed by lethal injection. The actual executions take place at the nearby Cummins Unit. The female death row is located at the McPherson Unit. Varner is one of the state of Arkansas's "parent units" for male prisoners; it serves as one of several units of initial assignment for processed male prisoners.

History

The Varner Unit was opened in 1987 with 300 beds, and its capacity was soon increased to 700 beds.  Further construction has brought the total capacity to over 1,600 prisoners. The supermax units opened in 2000, and federal grants paid 90% of the construction costs.

At one time the State of Arkansas housed all young male offenders in the state prison system in Varner. While this was the case, Correction Officers and prisoners nicknamed the facility the "Gladiator School."

On Friday August 22, 2003, all 39 Arkansas death row inmates were moved from the Maximum Security Unit to the Supermax at the Varner Unit.

In 2011, a fight among prisoners and correctional officers led to injuries among correctional officers.

During 2004/2005, ADC installed an electric fence between two non-electric fences in the Varner Unit. It received testing in late December 2004 and was activated in January 2005. The system used inmate labor to assist with the construction of the fence.

Composition
The property is in Choctaw Township.

Operations
Varner houses a vegetable processing plant.

The main campus of the Riverside Vocational Technical School is located behind the Varner Unit.

Notable inmates

Current 

 Zachary Holly: convicted in the murder of Jersey Bridgeman.

Former 
Death row:
 Damien Echols: member of the West Memphis Three (released on August 19, 2011).

Non-death row
 Jessie Misskelley: member of the West Memphis Three (released on August 19, 2011).
 Jason Baldwin : member of the West Memphis Three (released on August 19, 2011).

References

External links

Varner Unit, Arkansas Department of Corrections
 "Varner Unit" entry from the Encyclopedia of Arkansas History & Culture

Prisons in Arkansas
Buildings and structures in Lincoln County, Arkansas
Supermax prisons
Capital punishment in Arkansas
1987 establishments in Arkansas